Miss Silver is a fictional detective featured in 32 novels by British novelist Patricia Wentworth.

Character
Miss Maud Silver is a retired governess-turned-private detective. Like Miss Marple, Miss Silver's age and demeanor make her appear harmless. Some admire the character, believing that "while Miss Marple may receive ten times the attention as Miss Silver, ... the woefully neglected Miss Silver is the real deal - a professional investigator and stand-up woman, a true forerunner of all future female private eyes." Others disagree, claiming that the character "has none of the credibility of ... Miss Marple.... Her spinsterish appearance is inconsistent with her sensational behavior and also with the far-fetched plots of the novels she features in."

Wentworth wrote a series of 32 crime novels in the classic whodunit style, featuring Miss Maud Silver, a retired governess and teacher who becomes a professional private detective, in London, England. Miss Silver works closely with Scotland Yard, especially Inspector Frank Abbott, and is fond of quoting the poet Tennyson. Miss Silver is sometimes compared to Jane Marple, the elderly detective created by Agatha Christie. "Miss Silver is well known in the better circles of society, and she finds entree to the troubled households of the upper classes with little difficulty.  In most of Miss Silver's cases there is a young couple whose romance seems ill fated because of the murder to be solved, but in Miss Silver's competent hands the case is solved, the young couple are exonerated, and all is right in this very traditional world."

Novels
 Grey Mask, 1928
 The Case is Closed, 1937
 Lonesome Road, 1939
 Danger Point (U.S. title: In the Balance), 1941
 The Chinese Shawl, 1943
 Miss Silver Intervenes (U.S. title: Miss Silver Deals with Death), 1943
 The Clock Strikes Twelve, 1944
 The Key, 1944
 The Traveller Returns (U.S. title: She Came Back), 1945
 Pilgrim's Rest (also published as Dark Threat), 1946
 Latter End, 1947
 Spotlight (U.S. title: Wicked Uncle), 1947
 Eternity Ring, 1948
 The Case of William Smith, 1948
 Miss Silver Comes to Stay, 1949
 The Catherine Wheel, 1949
 Through the Wall, 1950
 The Brading Collection (also published as Mr. Brading's Collection), 1950
 The Ivory Dagger, 1951
 Anna, Where Are You? (also published as Death at Deep End), 1951
 The Watersplash, 1951
 Ladies' Bane, 1952
 Out of the Past, 1953
 Vanishing Point, 1953
 The Silent Pool, 1954
 The Benevent Treasure, 1953
 The Listening Eye, 1955
 Poison in the Pen, 1955
 The Gazebo (also published as The Summerhouse), 1956
 The Fingerprint, 1956
 The Alington Inheritance, 1958
 The Girl in the Cellar, 1961

Notes

References
 
 

Book series introduced in 1928
Female characters in literature
Literary characters introduced in 1928
Novel series
Silver, Miss